Predrag Rakić, known by his nickname Šeki, is a Bosnian drummer and music manager. He first found mainstream success as an original lineup member of a Bosnian garage rock band Zabranjeno Pušenje.

Career 
Rakić joined a Sarajevo-based garage rock band Zabranjeno Pušenje in 1983. He performed on the band's first two studio albums: Das ist Walter (1984) and Dok čekaš sabah sa šejtanom (1985). In 1986, he left the band with some other members.

Rakić performed on the Uhuhu's only studio album which bears the band's name. It was released in 1988. 

In 1989, joined a Slovenian rock band Sokoli. He contributed on all their releases; Bitka za ranjence (1989), Marija pomagaj (1990), and Satan je blazn zmatran (1992). Shortly after the release of the 1990 album, Rakić parted ways with the band. In 1992, he appeared on their third studio album as a guest musician.

Rakić lives and works in Slovenia.

Discography 

Zabranjeno pušenje
 Das ist Walter (1984)
 Dok čekaš sabah sa šejtanom (1985)

References

External links
 Discography on Discogs

Year of birth missing (living people)
Living people
Bosnia and Herzegovina expatriates in Slovenia
Bosnia and Herzegovina rock musicians
Musicians from Sarajevo
Punk rock drummers
Zabranjeno pušenje members
Yugoslav musicians